Mohamed Cassim Mohamed Faizal is a Sri Lankan politician and a member of the Parliament of Sri Lanka.

References
 

1957 births
Living people
Members of the 13th Parliament of Sri Lanka
Members of the 14th Parliament of Sri Lanka
Members of the 15th Parliament of Sri Lanka
Members of the 16th Parliament of Sri Lanka
Sri Lanka Muslim Congress politicians
Samagi Jana Balawegaya politicians
Sri Lankan Moor businesspeople
Sri Lankan Muslims